Dhainke is a village in the Punjab province of Pakistan. 

Populated places in Kasur District